Antonette is a given name. Notable people with this name include the following

Given name
Antonette Ruth Sabel (1894 – 1974), American music educator, composer, and arts administrator
Antonette Wemyss Gorman (born 1972 or 1973), Jamaican military officer
Antonette Wilken (born 1961), Zimbabwean diver
Antonette M. Zeiss, American clinical psychologist

Middle name
Kalilah Antonette Enríquez, given name of Kalilah Enríquez (born 1983), Belizean journalist and poet.
Henriette Marie Antonette Luplau, given name of Marie Luplau (1848 – 1925), Danish artist
Helena Antonette Gerrietsen, given name of Lenie Gerrietsen (born 1930), Dutch gymnast

See also

Antonetta
Antionette
Antoinette
Tonette (given name)